C-COR (former NASDAQ symbol CCBL) was an American communication services company incorporated in 1953 and based in State College, Pennsylvania until late 2007, when it was sold to ARRIS. The corporation was best known for creating video transport systems.

In 1965, C-COR introduced the use of integrated circuits in amplifiers used on utility poles and in 1969 was the first to use heat fins on amplifiers. In 1991, C-COR was the first to introduce a 1 GHz amplifier.

From the 1990s until its sale, C-COR's business focus moved from hardware amplifiers to communications service and software such as video on demand and cable television advertising insertion. By 2005, C-COR purchased five software companies: video on demand solution provider nCUBE in October 2004, Optinel Systems, Stargus, Alopa Networks, and Lantern Communications. In 2006, as part of a 225 person layoff, C-COR closed the Sunnyvale, California home of acquired Alopa Networks and Lantern Communications.

References

Defunct telecommunications companies of the United States
Defunct companies based in Pennsylvania
Telecommunications companies established in 1953
American companies established in 1953
Companies formerly listed on the Nasdaq
2007 mergers and acquisitions